Bunopus tuberculatus, also known as the Baluch rock gecko, Arabian desert gecko, or southern tuberculated gecko is a species of gecko found in the Middle East.

References

Bunopus
Reptiles described in 1874